"Boys of Summer" is the first episode of the fourth season of the HBO original series The Wire. Written by David Simon from a story by David Simon & Ed Burns, and directed by Joe Chappelle, it originally aired on September 10, 2006.

Plot
Snoop, Marlo Stanfield's young enforcer, replaces her cordless nail gun. Snoop and her mentor, Chris Partlow, prepare a vacant row house while a victim pleads with them. After the victim is shot with a suppressed pistol, they cover the body with quicklime and plastic sheets and nail the vacant building closed before leaving.

Councilman Tommy Carcetti and his deputy campaign manager, Norman Wilson, are busy with appointments and public appearances as Carcetti runs for mayor. The process of campaigning has left him bitter and disillusioned, and he ignores certain duties such as fundraising calls. Thomas "Herc" Hauk joins Mayor Clarence Royce's security detail. Royce's chief of staff, Coleman Parker, reports that Carcetti and Anthony Gray's campaigns are asking for two separate debates. In contrast to Carcetti, Royce has a speaking engagement with a healthy attendance at a harbor redevelopment site. Carcetti's engagement with the community initially makes him energized, but he sours upon hearing about his low poll numbers and assumes he has already lost. Later, an officer recognizes a drunk Carcetti sitting on a park bench at Federal Hill Park.

Bodie Broadus is shown running his own drug dealing crew, for which Namond Brice is the runner. One of Bodie's colleagues, Lex, complains that his baby's mother, Patrice, is dating Fruit, a crew chief from Marlo's organization. Lex threatens to kill Fruit, despite Bodie's warning that doing so will invoke Marlo's wrath. Bodie is met by Slim Charles, who now works for Proposition Joe. Meanwhile, Namond's friends Michael Lee and Randy Wagstaff ask to take them catching pigeons. Duquan "Dukie" Weems scares off the birds, which leads to Michael having to break up a fight between Dukie and Namond. That night, Lex shoots Fruit dead as he leaves a club. When Dukie is beaten up by children in the terraces, the boys plan to pelt them with water balloons filled with urine. The plan goes sour when Namond bursts a balloon on himself and his friends flee. Michael is caught and beaten. Later, Namond buys ice cream for his friends. Randy returns home and is scolded by his foster mother for breaking curfew.

Detectives Lester Freamon and Kima Greggs ask ASA Rhonda Pearlman to sign off on subpoenas of key political figures that they have linked to the Barksdale Organization. Greggs tricks Lieutenant Jimmy Asher, the Major Crimes Unit's new commander, into signing the papers they need. Freamon learns about Fruit's murder through the wiretap and meets with Bunk Moreland and Ed Norris, who are working the case in Homicide. Bunk gives Freamon a cell phone that they recovered from Fruit's body to garner more numbers for wiretaps. District Sergeant Ellis Carver harasses Bodie's crew, and encounters Jimmy McNulty, who is still a beat cop. When Bodie tries the politeness that Carver has taught him on Officer Anthony Colicchio he is angrily rebuked. Carver reminds Colicchio that if they come down hard on everyone, they'll have no one to get information from when something serious happens.

McNulty is called to meet with Major Cedric Daniels, now commander of the Western District, who urges him to move out of the patrol division and return to detective work. After McNulty declines the offer, Daniels reflects he is probably better off in Patrol on a personal level. At the roll call meeting, officers are given a misguided mandatory lecture about soft targets for terrorism in West Baltimore. Bunk visits McNulty to ask if he knows Lex, and is invited to dinner with his domestic partner Beadie Russell. Meanwhile, Roland "Prez" Pryzbylewski arrives at an inner city school as a trainee math teacher, and is immediately hired by the principal when he mentions being a former police officer. Prez attends a seminar on student motivation that seems to be as inept as the terrorism lecture in the Western. Prez later takes in his unkempt classroom, but seems excited at the prospect of teaching.

Marlo meets with his lieutenants to discuss how to retaliate for Fruit's murder, and settles for killing Lex. Little Kevin asks Randy to tell Lex that Patrice wants to meet him behind the playground that night. When Lex arrives, he finds Snoop and Partlow lying in wait. Bunk and Carver are unable to find Lex on his usual corner. While Randy is selling refreshments to Bodie's crew, Little Kevin gives him cash for following his instructions and reveals that Lex is dead. Snoop and Partlow board up another vacant house after leaving Lex's body there.

Production
Simon has commented that the influx of novice child actors led to an unruly behavior at the beginning of filming, but they became a closely knit group of professional young actors by the close of the series.

Non-fiction elements
During the counter-terrorism briefing, Carver jokes that terrorists "got jacked by Apex's crew." Apex was a real stick-up man in Baltimore in the 1990s whom Ed Burns met, and was one of several inspirations for Omar Little.

Title reference
The title refers to the children of West Baltimore on summer break. "The Boys of Summer" is also the title of a song by Don Henley and book by Roger Kahn, named from the poem 'I see the boys of summer' by Dylan Thomas. Both of those works illustrate a remembrance of glory days past and innocence lost. Thus the title sets the stage for the fourth season.

Epigraph

Assistant principal Donnelly makes this comment when Prez applies to be a teacher. This also can be applied to the group's (Michael, Namond, Duquan, and Randy) innocence before the events of the season begin to unfold, as well as Carcetti's inexperience heading into his campaign for election as mayor of Baltimore. The epigraph also ties into the sinister activities of Marlo's enforcers efficiently executing undesirables over pleas.

Music
The song playing in the background while Randy is selling candy to Little Kevin is "Survival of the Fittest" by Mobb Deep.

Credits

Starring cast
Although credited, Chad Coleman, John Doman, Frankie Faison, Andre Royo, Michael K. Williams and Robert Wisdom do not appear in this episode.

Guest stars

Jermaine Crawford as Duquan "Dukie" Weems
Maestro Harrell as Randy Wagstaff
Julito McCullum as Namond Brice
Tristan Wilds as Michael Lee
Gbenga Akinnagbe as Chris Partlow
Tootsie Duvall as Assistant Principal Marcia Donnelly
Henri Edmonds as School lecturer
Richard Hildebird as Principal Claudell Withers
Christopher Mann as Councilman Anthony Gray
Megan Anderson as Jen Carcetti
Brandy Burre as Theresa D'Agostino
Sam Coppola as "Young Tony" - Former Mayor
Joilet F. Harris as Officer Caroline Massey
Brandon Fobbs as Fruit
Anwan Glover as Slim Charles
Norman Jackson as Curtis "Lex" Anderson
Cleo Reginald Pizana as Chief of Staff Coleman Parker
Tyrell Baker as Little Kevin
Nathan Corbett as Donut
Felicia Pearson as Snoop
Karen Vicks as Gerry
Cynthia Webb-Manly as Teacher #2
Benjamin Busch as Officer Anthony Colicchio
Jay Landsman as Lieutenant Dennis Mello
Ed Norris as Detective Ed Norris
Jason Parker as Officer Reggie Leddett
Michael Salconi as Officer Michael Santangelo
Tyreeka Freamon as School Receptionist
Thomas C. Hessenauer as Teacher #1
Paul L. Nolan as Hardware store employee
Jim Rood as Southern District Patrol Officer
Gene Terinoni as Lieutenant Jimmy Asher

Uncredited appearances

Ryan Sands as Officer Lloyd "Truck" Garrick
Kwame Patterson as Monk Metcalf
Thuliso Dingwall as Kenard
Shante Usual as Patrice
Marlyne Afflack as Nerese Campbell
Denise Hart as Miss Anna Jeffries
Bryan McLarney as Bryan - Western District Officer
Tamieka Chavis as Royce's Assistant
Chris James as Carcetti's Driver
Mark Joy as Ed Bowers - Property Developer
Atif Lanier as Western District Officer
Thomas Joe Craig as Construction Foreman
Derek A. Smith as Construction Foreman
Unknown as Tote (Stanfield Soldier)
Unknown as Reesy
Unknown as Lieutenant Hoskins
Unknown as Miss Simmons
Unknown as Reverend Garnett

Thomas Hessenauer has a cameo in this episode as a dissenting school teacher; he is also the assistant to executive producer Nina Kostroff Noble.

First appearances
Namond Brice: Middle school child who works as a runner for Bodie Broadus.  He is the son of infamous Barksdale drug enforcer Wee-Bey Brice.
Michael Lee: Middle school child who takes a leadership role amongst his peers.
Randy Wagstaff: Middle school child who lives with a strict foster mother and is known for his imagination and entrepreneurship. He is the son of "Cheese" Wagstaff.
Duquan "Dukie" Weems: Impoverished middle school child whose mother is a drug addict; often bullied by his peers.
Norman Wilson: Tommy Carcetti's new deputy campaign manager.
Gerry: Senior Carcetti campaign staffer.
Lieutenant Asher: Commander of the major case unit. Asher is a retiring Lieutenant who provides no interference with the cases being conducted under the lead of Lester Freamon.
Lieutenant Hoskins: Commander of mayor Royce's security detail.
Monk: A lieutenant in the Stanfield Organization.
Lex, Little Kevin and Reesy: Drug dealers in Bodie's crew.
Donut: Middle school child who is friends with Namond, Michael and Randy.
Claudell Withers: Edward Tilghman middle school's principal who handles most of the school's external problems.
Marcia Donnelly: Edward Tilghman middle school's assistant principal who handles most of the school's internal problems.
Nerese Campbell: Baltimore City Council President on Mayor Clarence Royce's election ticket.

Reception

Ratings
The episode drew an average of 1.5 million viewers. Coverage considered this as low compared to other HBO series like Deadwood and The Sopranos, but felt that including repeats of the episode and video-on-demand viewers would enhance the figure. Despite the low figures HBO commissioned a fifth season of the show two days after the episode aired.

Critical response
An Entertainment Weekly critic named the opening scene of the episode as the first of his "five reasons to live" for the week. A second critic picked out the parallels between the police briefing and the teachers seminar as a key element of the episode tying the institution of the school and the police department together. He also saw the scenes as significant in demonstrating how far removed the bureaucracies of modern lives are from reality.

References

External links
"Boys of Summer" at HBO.com

The Wire (season 4) episodes
2006 American television episodes
Television episodes written by David Simon